The Warner Animation Group (WAG) is an American animation studio that serves as the computer-animated feature film label of Warner Bros.' theatrical film production and distribution division, Warner Bros. Pictures. Established on January 7, 2013, by Jeff Robinov, the studio is the successor to the dissolved 2D traditional hand-drawn animation studio Warner Bros. Feature Animation, which shut down in 2004, and is also a sister to the regular Warner Bros. Animation studio.

Its first film, The Lego Movie, was released on February 7, 2014, and its most recent film was DC League of Super-Pets on July 29, 2022; their upcoming slate of films includes Coyote vs. Acme in 2023, Toto on February 2, 2024,  The Cat in the Hat in 2024, Thing One and Thing Two in 2026, and Oh, the Places You'll Go! in 2027. Films produced by WAG have grossed a total of $2 billion at the box office.

History
On January 7, 2013, Jeff Robinov (then head of the studio's motion picture division) founded a screenplay development department, nicknamed a "think tank" for developing theatrical animated films, known as the Warner Animation Group. The group includes John Requa, Glenn Ficarra, Nicholas Stoller, Jared Stern, Phil Lord and Christopher Miller, Sarah Smith and Mark Osborne. Warner Bros. created the group with the hope that the box office reception of their films will be competitive with other animation studios' releases.

On February 7, 2014, Warner Animation Group released their first film, The Lego Movie, a film animated by Animal Logic, which also provided the animation for both spinoffs. It was met with critical praise and proved to be a box-office success.

WAG's second film, Storks, was released September 23, 2016. It received mixed reviews from critics.

On February 10, 2017, Warner Animation Group released The Lego Batman Movie, which received positive reviews from critics and was a box office success. On December 14, 2017, Warner Bros. announced Allison Abbate had been named Executive Vice President, and Chris Leahy has been named Senior Vice President.

The Lego Ninjago Movie, based on the Lego Ninjago toys, was released on September 22, 2017. Upon release, the film was met with mixed reviews from critics and became the first film from the studio and franchise to fail to recoup its budget.

Smallfoot, released September 28, 2018, earned a 76% approval rating on Rotten Tomatoes with mostly positive reviews from critics and became a box office success by grossing over $214 million worldwide.

The Lego Movie 2: The Second Part, a sequel to The Lego Movie, was released February 8, 2019 and earned an 85% approval rating on Rotten Tomatoes with generally positive reviews from critics but only grossed around $192.3 million worldwide, almost barely recouping its budget and becoming the studio and franchise's second box office disappointment.

In October 2019, Locksmith Animation formed a multi-year production deal with Warner Bros. Pictures and Warner Animation Group, which will distribute Locksmith's films.

An animated reboot of the  Scooby-Doo film series titled Scoob! was initially set for a theatrical release on May 15, 2020, but then it was delayed due to the COVID-19 pandemic. On April 21, 2020, it was announced that it would instead go to video on demand in response to the pandemic. It received mixed reviews from critics.

A live-action/animated film based on Tom & Jerry was released internationally on February 11, 2021, and on February 26 in the United States in theaters and HBO Max simultaneously and also debuted the company's new logo to match with the design of the new shield logo that Warner Bros. debuted back in November 2019, and like the main WB logo, which was debuted that year with Locked Down, it is made by Devastudios, using Terragen for the sky and clouds, along with the studio's blueprints from the Warner Bros. Studio Facilies and the available photography and videography from the Warner Bros. Studio Tour Hollywood and Google Maps, all in order to reconstruct it in CGI. It received generally negative reviews from critics, and is the first film from the company to have met so, but was a box-office success.

Space Jam: A New Legacy, starring LeBron James, was released on July 16, 2021, and was the first film from Warner Animation Group to incorporate traditional animation. It also received generally negative reviews from critics and is the second film from the company to have met so after Tom & Jerry, due to the film being heavy on product placement of the studio's intellectual properties.

An animated film based on the Legion of Super-Pets titled DC League of Super-Pets was released on July 29, 2022. It received generally positive reviews from critics.

A Christmas-themed spin-off prequel titled Scoob! Holiday Haunt, taking place in the gang's youth, with the actors who portrayed their younger selves reprising, was set for release in 2022 on HBO Max, but was cancelled following the merger of WarnerMedia and Discovery Inc. to form Warner Bros. Discovery in April 2022 by CEO David Zaslav on August 2, 2022, citing cost-cutting measures and a refocus on theatrical films rather than creating projects for streaming. Following the merger, it was announced in August that Allison Abbate would be leaving the studio.

On February 9, 2023, the studio is in talks about former DreamWorks Animation chief creative officer Bill Damaschke to lead.

Upcoming releases
WAG's third live-action/animation hybrid, a Wile E. Coyote film titled Coyote vs. Acme, was originally scheduled to be theatrically released in the United States on July 21, 2023, by Warner Bros. Pictures. On April 26, 2022, it was taken off the release schedule, with Barbie taking over its original release date. However, the film was quoted to still release on an undisclosed date in 2023. The film will be directed by Dave Green and produced by Chris DeFaria and James Gunn.

A musical feature adaptation of Michael Morpurgo's children's book Toto: The Dog-Gone Amazing Story Of The Wizard Of Oz began animation production in February 2021. It is being directed by Alex Timbers, from a screenplay by John August, and produced by Derek Frey. It is set to be released on February 2, 2024.

Warner Animation Group is also collaborating with Dr. Seuss Enterprises to produce films based on a series of children's books of Dr. Seuss properties, including film adaptations of both The Cat in the Hat (2024) and Oh, the Places You'll Go! (2027). They're also developing a spin-off film of The Cat in the Hat with the focus on Thing One and Thing Two (2026), with collaboration with J. J. Abrams' production company Bad Robot Productions.

There are also plans to develop a DC League of Super-Pets franchise following the film's critical and commercial success.

Production
Similar to Paramount Animation, Netflix Animation, and Sony Pictures Animation, the Warner Animation Group outsources their computer-animated films' production to other studios. Such as Animal Logic (The Lego Movie franchise,  DC League of Super-Pets and Toto),  Sony Pictures Imageworks (Storks and Smallfoot), Reel FX Creative Studios (Scoob!), Framestore (Tom & Jerry), Industrial Light & Magic (Space Jam: A New Legacy) and DNEG (Coyote vs. Acme). However, Space Jam: A New Legacy did also include hand-drawn animation, which is done in-house and also outsourced from Company 3 Animation, and Tonic DNA.

The budgets for their films tend to range from $60–80 million. Their most expensive films to date, The Lego Movie 2: The Second Part, Scoob! and Space Jam: A New Legacy, cost $99 million, $90 million and $150 million respectively. DC League of Super-Pets also cost as $90 million.

The screenplay department is reportedly somewhat similar to Pixar Animation Studios' "brain trust" in terms of how its members consult with one another and give feedback on each other's projects. The group is nicknamed the "think tank".

Filmography

Franchises

Accolades

See also
Warner Bros. Animation
Rhythm and Hues Studios
Pixar Animation Studios
Walt Disney Animation Studios
Universal Animation Studios
Turner Feature Animation
Warner Bros. Feature Animation
DreamWorks Animation
Blue Sky Studios
Illumination Entertainment
Paramount Animation
Sony Pictures Animation
Fox Animation Studios
List of Warner Bros. theatrical animated feature films

Notes

References

 
2013 establishments in California
Warner Bros. Animation
Warner Bros. divisions
American companies established in 2013
Mass media companies established in 2013
Film production companies of the United States
Companies based in Burbank, California
American animation studios